John Lindsay Collins (21 January 1949 – 14 April 2020) was a Welsh professional footballer who played for Tottenham Hotspur, Portsmouth, Dallas Tornado, Halifax Town, Sheffield Wednesday, Barnsley, Kidderminster Harriers and represented Wales at schoolboy and seven occasions at Under-23 level.

Playing career
Collins was born in Rhymney, and began his career in Wales at Swansea then in March 1964 he moved to London to become an apprentice with Tottenham Hotspur. The full back played two first team matches for Spurs in the old First Division. His debut came against Sunderland which ended in defeat followed by another defeat against Nottingham Forest.

He signed for Portsmouth for a fee of £5,000 in May 1971, Collins made his debut in the opening game of the 1971–72 season at home against Middlesbrough which ended with a 2–1 victory. He went on to compete in a total of 87 matches.

After leaving Fratton Park, Collins joined the North American Soccer League team Dallas Tornado in 1974 and featured in 18 matches and scored one goal. Collins was transferred to Halifax Town in August 1974 and featured in a further 82 games and scored one goal. He had a spell with Sheffield Wednesday where he notched up seven appearances in 1976 before signing for Barnsley in December 1976. Between 1976–79 he played 130 matches for the Yorkshire club and netted one goal. Collins ended his senior career at Kidderminster Harriers.

In 1979 Collins moved back to America, this time to play for the indoor Soccer team Baltimore Blast.

Personal life and death
After football Collins moved back to Wales in the 1980s where he became a pub landlord running three pubs and a hotel all in Haverfordwest. In later life he had diabetes, and had to have both legs amputated before his death on 14 April 2020, aged 71.

References

External links

1949 births
2020 deaths
People from Bedwellty
Sportspeople from Caerphilly County Borough
Association football fullbacks
Barnsley F.C. players
Dallas Tornado players
Halifax Town A.F.C. players
Kidderminster Harriers F.C. players
North American Soccer League (1968–1984) players
Portsmouth F.C. players
Sheffield Wednesday F.C. players
English Football League players
Tottenham Hotspur F.C. players
Welsh expatriate footballers
Welsh expatriate sportspeople in the United States
Welsh footballers
Wales under-23 international footballers